The 2016–17 National First Division was the season from August 2016 to May 2017 of South Africa's second tier of professional soccer, the National First Division.

League table

Play-offs

References

External links
PSL.co.za
NFD Log

National First Division seasons
South
2016–17 in South African soccer leagues